Arafat Chekrouni (born 7 October 1966) is a former tennis player from Morocco.

Chekrouni represented his native country at the 1984 Summer Olympics in Los Angeles, where he was defeated in the second round by Italy's Paolo Canè. The Moroccan reached his highest singles ATP-ranking on 27 October 1986, when he became World Number 369.

Chekrouni participated in eleven Davis Cup ties for Morocco from 1984–1992, posting a 7-8 record in singles and a 2-5 record in doubles.

External links
 
 
 

1966 births
Moroccan male tennis players
Tennis players at the 1984 Summer Olympics
Olympic tennis players of Morocco
Living people
Place of birth missing (living people)
Mediterranean Games gold medalists for Morocco
Mediterranean Games silver medalists for Morocco
Mediterranean Games medalists in tennis
Competitors at the 1987 Mediterranean Games
20th-century Moroccan people
21st-century Moroccan people